Régis Boyer (25 June 1932 – 16 June 2017) was a French literary scholar, historian and translator, specialised on Nordic literature and the Viking Age.

Biography
Régis Boyer was born in Reims on 25 June 1932. At age 20 he earned a degree in literature from the Nancy University, where he became interested in Scandinavian culture during a course held by Maurice Gravier. He served in the Algerian War for 15 months before resuming his studies. He took an agrégation in modern literature in 1959, after which he left France to teach French literature at the University of Łódź (1959–1961), Reykjavík University (1961–1963), Lund University (1963–1964) and Uppsala University (1964–1970). In 1970 he returned to France to obtain his doctorate and to teach at the Paris-Sorbonne University, where he became a professor of Scandinavian languages, literature and civilisation and served as director of the Institute of Scandinavian Studies until his retirement in 2001. He was known as a specialist on the Viking Age.

Among his translations into French are many Old Norse sagas and the Poetic Edda, and modern works by Nordic writers such as Knut Hamsun, Pär Lagerkvist, Halldór Laxness, Henrik Ibsen, Hans Christian Andersen and August Strindberg.

He died from a cardiac arrest in his home in La Varenne-Saint-Hilaire on 16 June 2017.

References

Further reading
 

1932 births
2017 deaths
Writers from Reims
Translators from Danish
Translators from Norwegian
Translators from Swedish
Translators from Icelandic
Translators of the Poetic Edda
Scandinavian studies scholars
20th-century French historians
21st-century French historians
Academic staff of Paris-Sorbonne University
Old Norse studies scholars
Writers on Germanic paganism
Academic staff of the University of Łódź
Academic staff of Reykjavík University
Academic staff of Lund University
Academic staff of Uppsala University
French military personnel of the Algerian War
Winners of the Prix Broquette-Gonin (literature)
Officiers of the Ordre des Palmes Académiques
Knights Grand Cross of the Order of the Falcon
Order of Saint Olav
Knights of the Order of the Dannebrog
Commanders of the Order of the Polar Star
20th-century French translators